Zhejiang A&F University Station is a metro station on Line 16 of the Hangzhou Metro in China. It is located in the Lin'an District of Hangzhou and it serves the nearby Zhejiang A & F University.

Station Layout

References

Railway stations in Zhejiang
Railway stations in China opened in 2020
Hangzhou Metro stations